Sir John James Cowperthwaite, KBE, CMG (25 April 1915 – 21 January 2006), was a British civil servant who served as Financial Secretary of Hong Kong from 1961 to 1971. His introduction of free market economic policies are widely credited with turning postwar Hong Kong into a thriving global financial centre. During Cowperthwaite's tenure as Financial Secretary, real wages in Hong Kong rose by 50% and the portion of the population in acute poverty fell from 50% to 15%.

Early years

Cowperthwaite was born on 25 April 1915 in Edinburgh to John Cowperthwaite, a surveyor of taxes, and Jessie Jarvis. He attended Merchiston Castle School in Edinburgh, Scotland, and later studied classics at St Andrews University and Christ's College, Cambridge. In 1940, he gained a first class degree in economics at St Andrews University on an accelerated one year degree programme with Professor James Nisbet. He joined the British Colonial Administrative Service as a Hong Kong Cadet in 1941, but during World War II was posted to Sierra Leone instead because of the Japanese invasion of Hong Kong.

Hong Kong

He arrived in Hong Kong in 1945 and was assigned to the Department of Supplies, Trade and Industry. Cowperthwaite built on the economic policies of his predecessors, Arthur Clarke and Geoffrey Follows, promoting free trade, low taxation, budget surpluses, limited state intervention in the economy, a distrust of industrial planning, and sound money. It was a policy mix that drew more on Adam Smith and Gladstone than on Keynes and Attlee. However, Cowperthwaite was a pragmatic civil servant rather than a theoretician and he based his policies on his experience, empirical data and what he believed would work in practice.

He refused to compile GDP statistics arguing that such data was not useful to managing an economy and would lead to officials meddling in the economy. He was once asked what the key thing that poor countries could do to improve their growth. Cowperthwaite replied:  According to Catherine R. Schenk, Cowperthwaite's policies helped it to develop from one of the poorest places on earth to one of the wealthiest and most prosperous: "Low taxes, lax employment laws, absence of government debt, and free trade are all pillars of the Hong Kong experience of economic development." The Economic Freedom of the World 2015 Report ranks Hong Kong as both the freest economy in the world, a distinction it has held since this index began ranking countries in 1975, and among the most prosperous.

Throughout the 1960s, Cowperthwaite refused to implement free universal primary education, contributing to relatively high illiteracy rates in today's older generation. Compulsory education was only introduced under the governorship of Sir Murray MacLehose the next decade. At a time when Hong Kong's roads were crippled by traffic congestion, Cowperthwaite also steadfastly opposed construction of the Mass Transit Railway, a costly undertaking which was nevertheless built following his retirement. It would later become one of the world's most heavily utilised (and profitable) railways.

In 1960, he was appointed as an Officer of the Most Excellent Order of the British Empire (OBE) and, in 1964, a Companion of the Most Distinguished Order of Saint Michael and Saint George (CMG). He later became a Knight Commander of the Most Excellent Order of the British Empire (KBE) in 1968.

Commentators have credited his management of the economy of Hong Kong as a leading example of how small government encourages growth.

Post–civil service career
After leaving his retirement, he was international adviser to Jardine Fleming, the Hong Kong–based investment bank until 1981. He retired and left Hong Kong for St Andrews, Scotland and became a member of The Royal and Ancient Golf Club of St Andrews.

Personal life and death
He married Sheila Thomson in 1941. They had one son. He died in Scotland on 21 January 2006, aged 90; his son predeceased him.

See also
 Economy of Hong Kong
 Milton Friedman
 Positive non-interventionism

References

External links

 Britain's Trillion Pound Horror Story · Watch on 4OD · Play on 4OD Player
 Tribute to John James Cowperthwaite by The Lion Rock Institute of Hong Kong
 Sir John Cowperthwaite obituary from the Daily Telegraph
 Sir John Cowperthwaite obituary from The Guardian
  by Tim Worstall
 The Hong Kong Experiment by Milton Friedman

1915 births
2006 deaths
Government officials of Hong Kong
Financial Secretaries of Hong Kong
People educated at Merchiston Castle School
Alumni of the University of St Andrews
Alumni of Christ's College, Cambridge
Knights Commander of the Order of the British Empire
Companions of the Order of St Michael and St George
Politicians from Edinburgh